The Shadow Secretary of State for Defence is a member of the UK Shadow Cabinet responsible for the scrutiny of the Secretary of State for Defence and the department, the Ministry of Defence. The post is currently held by John Healey.

Shadow Secretaries of State

See also 

 Secretary of State for Defence
 Ministry of Defence
 UK Shadow Cabinet

References

External links 

Official Opposition (United Kingdom)